is the remains of a fortified residence of the Sanada clan in Ueda, Nagano Prefecture, Japan. The site is believed that it was a main bastion of the Sanada clan until Sanada Masayuki moved their base to Ueda Castle in 1585. 

Sanada-shi Yakata was considered unsuitable for withstanding a siege and Sanada clan had such castles as Sanada-shi Honjō Castle and Tenpaku Castle near the residence.

Its ruins have been protected as a Prefectural Historic Sites. The residence is now only ruins, with some stone walls, moats, and earthworks. Kōtai Shrine which was built by Sanada Masayuki when Sanada clan left the residence is on site. Sanada clan Historical Museum is adjacent to the site.

Gallery

See also
List of Historic Sites of Japan (Nagano)

References

Castles in Nagano Prefecture
Historic Sites of Japan
Former castles in Japan
Sanada clan
Ruined castles in Japan